Gilhooley or Gilhooly is a surname which may refer to:

People
 Brenda Gilhooly (born 1964), English comedian
 David Gilhooly (1943–2013), American ceramic artist
 Frank Gilhooley (1892–1959), American baseball player
 Frankie Gilhooley (1924–2010), American basketball player and baseball announcer
 James Gilhooly (1847–1916), Irish Nationalist politician
 Maria Gilhooley, stage name Marry Waterson, English singer, songwriter and visual artist
 Michael Gilhooley (1894–1969), Scottish footballer
 Patrick Gilhooley (1876–1907), Scottish footballer
 Ray Gilhooley (1887–1973), American racecar driver

Fictional characters
 The widow Gilhooley, in the Irish television series Killinaskully
 Thomas "Boats" Gilhooley, in the 1963 John Ford movie Donovan's Reef, played by Lee Marvin

See also
 Gilhoolie, a jar opener

Surnames of Irish origin
Anglicised Irish-language surnames